Miguel Caldés Luis (September 27, 1970 - December 4, 2000) was a Cuban baseball player and Olympic gold and silver medalist.

Caldés was a one time Gold medalist for baseball, winning at the 1996 Summer Olympics.

He also won a Silver medal at the 2000 Summer Olympics for baseball.

He died on December 4, 2000 in Saratoga, Camagüey, Cuba.

External links
Olympic Info

1970 births
2000 deaths
Olympic baseball players of Cuba
Baseball players at the 2000 Summer Olympics
Baseball players at the 1996 Summer Olympics
Olympic silver medalists for Cuba
Olympic gold medalists for Cuba
Olympic medalists in baseball

Medalists at the 2000 Summer Olympics
Medalists at the 1996 Summer Olympics